Walter George Druce (16 September 1872 – 8 January 1963) was an English cricketer who played in first-class cricket matches for Cambridge University, the Marylebone Cricket Club (MCC) and other amateur teams between 1894 and 1913. He was born at Denmark Hill in London (then counted as part of Surrey) and died at Sherborne, Dorset.

References

1872 births
1963 deaths
English cricketers
Cambridge University cricketers
Gentlemen of England cricketers
Marylebone Cricket Club cricketers
Free Foresters cricketers
H. D. G. Leveson Gower's XI cricketers